The Jefferson Square Commercial Historic District is a nationally recognized historic district located in Jefferson, Iowa, United States.  It was listed on the National Register of Historic Places in 2011.  At the time of its nomination the district consisted of 59 resources, including 38 contributing buildings, one contributing structure, one contributing object, 18 non-contributing buildings, and one non-contributing object.  The district covers the original central business district.  The commercial buildings are from one to three stories in height, and Late Victorian architectural styles dominate.

The period of significance dates from 1873, with the construction of the oldest recognizable surviving building, to 1966, with the
completion of the Mahanay Memorial Carillon Tower. The tower dominates not only the district, but Jefferson as well.  Planning for the tower began before World War II.  The Modern Movement, limestone sheathed, structure stands on the southwest corner of the courthouse square, and rises  to an enclosed viewing platform and open-air 14-bell carillon.  The Greene County Courthouse (1917), a statue of Abraham Lincoln (1918), and a Lincoln Highway Marker (1928) are all on the square and are individually listed on the National Register.  All four structures are also along the old Lincoln Highway, which passed along the south side of the square beginning in 1913.  That was during a period of peak economic growth for the community (1912-1917) and the buildings along the square were substantially completed at that time.

References

Jefferson, Iowa
National Register of Historic Places in Greene County, Iowa
Historic districts on the National Register of Historic Places in Iowa
Historic districts in Greene County, Iowa
Victorian architecture in Iowa
Modernist architecture in Iowa